Bramingham is a suburb of Luton, in the Borough of Luton district, in the ceremonial county of Bedfordshire, England. The area is situated in the north of the town and is roughly bounded by the A6 to the east, Great Bramingham Wood to the west, the edge of Luton to the north, and Icknield Way to the south.

History
Until the end of the 20th century Bramingham consisted of Great Bramingham, a small hamlet consisting of Great Bramingham Farm and a few scattered houses on Great Bramingham Lane, and Little Bramingham Farm, a farm near Bramingham Wood. Little Bramingham farmhouse still stands, located on Leamington Road, and is now a grade II listed building.

The area grew rapidly in the 1980s and 1990s to become part of Luton, expanding to meet Warden Hill in the east and Marsh Farm in the west.

Local Area
The housing in the area is mainly low density suburban housing built in typical 80s and 90s new build style, a traditional style with many incorporating mock timber frames or arched windows. A few 19th century cottages remain on Great Bramingham Lane.

At the centre of Bramingham is a parade of shops, a large Sainsbury's supermarket, a medical centre, Bramingham Park Church, and a pub - The Brim and Crown (formerly The Bramingham). Also in the area are Bramingham Primary School and a campus of Barnfield College.

On land of the former Great Bramingham Farm is Keech Cottage Hospice, a care charity for both adults and children.

There is also a large business park centred on Enterprise Way.

Geography
Bramingham is in the north of Luton, roughly 5 miles from the town centre. Neighbouring areas are Limbury and Runfold to the south, Marsh Farm to the west, and Warden Hill to the east. North of Bramingham is still open countryside, although there are plans for a North Luton Bypass to be built, and infill housing between Bramingham and the new road.

Bramingham Wood
Bramingham Wood is a natural woodland which forms the boundary between Bramingham and Marsh Farm. In 1985 The Woodland Trust, a nationwide charity took over the management and subsequently the ownership of the wood from the private owners.

After the Trust took over the wood, the Bramingham Wood Volunteers were formed who carry out much of the work on behalf of the Trust. A network of paths through the wood have been created.

The wood has a spectacular spring bluebell display and also pink campion flourishes in the cleared areas.

Politics
Bramingham is part of the larger Bramingham ward, which also contains Warden Hill, and is represented by Cllr Gilbert Campbell (Conservative) and Cllr John Young (Conservative).

The ward forms part of the parliamentary constituency of Luton North and the MP is Sarah Owen (Labour).

Local Attractions

Local newspapers
Two weekly newspapers cover Bramingham, although they are not specific to the area.

They are the:
 Herald and Post
 Luton News

References

External links
 Bramingham Primary School

Wards of Luton
Areas of Luton